The Nelson H. Greene House, located in Ritzville, Washington, United States, is a house listed on the National Register of Historic Places.

See also
 National Register of Historic Places listings in Washington

References

1902 establishments in Washington (state)
Houses completed in 1902
Houses in Adams County, Washington
Houses on the National Register of Historic Places in Washington (state)
Neoclassical architecture in Washington (state)
Queen Anne architecture in Washington (state)
National Register of Historic Places in Adams County, Washington